The 2017 London Broncos season was the thirty-eighth in the club's history and their third consecutive season out of the Super League. Competing in the 2017 Kingstone Press Championship, the club was coached by Andrew Henderson, finishing in 2nd place and reaching the Fourth Round of the 2017 Challenge Cup. They failed to achieve promotion after finishing 6th place in the 2017 Super League Qualifiers.

It was their second since moving to Ealing. They exited the Challenge Cup with a defeat by the Toronto Wolfpack.

2017 milestones

2017 squad

2017 tables

Regular season

Qualifiers

2017 fixtures and results
2017 RFL Championship

2017 Transfers
Gains

Losses

References

London Broncos seasons
London Broncos season
2017 in rugby league by club
2017 in English rugby league